The mottled beauty (Alcis repandata) is a moth of the family Geometridae. The species was first described by Carl Linnaeus in his 1758 10th edition of Systema Naturae.

Subspecies and forms
Subspecies and forms include: 
Alcis repandata muraria
Alcis repandata repandata
Alcis repandata sodorensium
Alcis repandata f. conversaria
Alcis repandata f. nigricata

Distribution
Alcis repandata is a common species of Europe and the Near East, extending throughout Europe to the Urals, in the south over the Mediterranean, Asia Minor, the Caucasus to Kazakhstan and in the north to the Arctic Circle.

Habitat
The species inhabits deciduous, mixed and coniferous forests, bushy heaths, meadows, marshes and settlement areas. In the Alps occurs up to 1800 meters.

Description

Alcis repandata has a wingspan reaching 30–45 mm. This is an extremely variable species, typically being buff or grey with black bars along the costa, but often with a broad blackish band across the forewings. 
Meyrick describes it - The head is grey mixed with whitish and fuscous. The forewings are light ochreous-brown, sprinkled with black and sometimes with whitish. The first line is curved, the median line is twice sinuate and dark fuscous, sometimes partly confluent. The second line is dark fuscous, roundly projecting above and below the middle. The subterminal is waved and pale or whitish, partially dark-margined. There is a blackish discal spot before the median. The hindwings are as the forewings, but the lines are less marked and regular. There is a discal dot beyond median. Melanic forms are also common, especially in industrial areas. In all but the darkest variations the most characteristic feature is a pale zigzag line across the hindwing. The larva is pale greenish-ochreous, brown-marked, sometimes suffused with dark grey, dusted with yellow. The dorsal line is brown or dark grey, distinct on segments 2–4, often obsolete elsewhere. Segments 5-12 sometimes have pale dorsal diamonds. See also Prout (1912–16)

This species is rather similar to Willow Beauty (Peribatodes rhomboidaria) and its congeners. See Townsend et al.

Biology
This moth flies at night in June and July in the British Isles. It is attracted to light. 

The larva feeds on the leaves and soft bark of a wide range of trees and other plants (see list below). 

The species overwinters as a small larva.

Recorded food plants
Host plants include:

Alnus – alder
Betula – birch
Calluna – heather
Crataegus – hawthorn
Cytisus – broom
Filipendula – meadowsweet
Ligustrum – privet
Lonicera – honeysuckle
Quercus – oak
Rhododendron
Ribes – currant
Rubus – bramble
Rumex – dock
Salix – willow
Sorbus – rowan
Tilia – lime
Vaccinium

Gallery

References

Chinery, Michael Collins Guide to the Insects of Britain and Western Europe 1986 (Reprinted 1991)
Skinner, Bernard Colour Identification Guide to Moths of the British Isles 1984

External links

 Alcis repandata - Biodiversity Heritage Library - Bibliography
Lepiforum e.V.
 Paolo Mazzei, Daniel Morel, Raniero Panfili  Moths and Butterflies of Europe and North Africa

Boarmiini
Moths described in 1758
Moths of Europe
Moths of Asia
Taxa named by Carl Linnaeus